Juan Oscar Munoz (born September 25, 1969) is a former Major League Baseball pitcher.

Munoz attended the University of Miami and was drafted by the Cleveland Indians in the fifth round of the 1990 amateur draft. He played in the Cleveland farm system until 1991. While with the Kinston Indians of the Carolina League, Munoz threw a no-hitter against the Prince William Cannons on May 26, 1991.

On March 28, 1992, Munoz and Curt Leskanic were traded to the Minnesota Twins organization for Paul Sorrento. While with Nashville in the Southern League, Munoz was named to the 1993 all-star team and was awarded Southern League Pitcher of the Year honors. He remained in the Twins farm system until 1995, when he was called up to the majors. In ten games, Muñoz went 2-1 with a 5.60 ERA.

During the off-season, Munoz was selected off waivers by the Baltimore Orioles. He wound up his playing career playing for Rochester in the International League in 1996.

Sources

1969 births
Living people
Minnesota Twins players
Baseball players from Florida
Major League Baseball pitchers
Canton-Akron Indians players
Kinston Indians players
Nashville Xpress players
Miami Hurricanes baseball players
American baseball players of Mexican descent
All-American college baseball players
Minor league baseball managers
Gulf Coast Orioles players
Orlando Sun Rays players
Portland Beavers players
Rochester Red Wings players
Salt Lake Buzz players
Watertown Indians players
Christopher Columbus High School (Miami-Dade County, Florida) alumni